Estanislao Valdés Otero (born 18 August 1931 in Montevideo) is a Uruguayan lawyer, author, and politician.

During the Civic-military dictatorship of Uruguay he was Minister of Agriculture and Fisheries (2 February 1977 – 14 April 1978) and afterwards Minister of Foreign Relations (17 February 1981 – 2 September 1982). He was in charge of keeping Uruguay neutral during the Falklands War.

Works
 Derechos de autor: régimen jurídico uruguayo. Prologue by Eduardo J. Couture (Facultad de Derecho, Montevideo, 1953).
 Inflación y subdesarrollo (Fundación de Cultura Universitaria, 1992).

References

1931 births
Living people
People from Montevideo
University of the Republic (Uruguay) alumni
20th-century Uruguayan lawyers
Civic-military dictatorship of Uruguay
Ministers of Livestock, Agriculture, and Fisheries of Uruguay
Foreign ministers of Uruguay